The Million Dollar Challenge may refer to:
 The Nedbank Golf Challenge, an annual golf tournament
 The One Million Dollar Paranormal Challenge administered by the James Randi Educational Foundation to demonstrate psychic ability
 Million Dollar Challenge (TV program), an American poker television show